Nwagi (Nepali: न्वागी), also spelled Nuagi or Udhauli, is a major festival celebrated the by Kirat community.

Nwagi is celebrated prior to eating the harvested food crops, some of which are offered to ancestors and nature gods. Locals believe that if somebody eats the crops without celebrating Nwagi, they will be cursed by their ancestors.

References

Festivals in Nepal